Adult Contemporary is a chart published by Billboard ranking the top-performing songs in the United States in the adult contemporary music (AC) market. In 1989, 19 songs topped the chart, then published under the title Hot Adult Contemporary, based on playlists submitted by radio stations.

In the year's first issue of Billboard the number one song was "Two Hearts" by Phil Collins, which was in its third week at number one, and would go on to spend three weeks at number one in 1989.  Collins would also go on to have the final chart-topper of the year, as "Another Day in Paradise" occupied the top spot for the final five weeks of 1989.  The eight weeks which Collins spent at number one during the year was the most by any act.  The only other artist to achieve more than one chart-topper in 1989 was Cher, who spent a single week at number one with "If I Could Turn Back Time" and a further four with "After All", a duet with Peter Cetera.  Two songs tied for the longest unbroken run at number one during the year, each spending six weeks atop the chart.  British group Simply Red topped the chart for six weeks in June and July with "If You Don't Know Me by Now" and American vocalist Richard Marx had a similar run in August and September with "Right Here Waiting".

In February, Canadian band Sheriff's song "When I'm with You" spent a single week at number one.  The song had originally been a minor hit in the United States six years earlier, but was re-released in 1989, several years after the band had broken up, as part of a fad of radio programmers reviving songs from earlier in the decade which had not achieved success.  The re-issued song went on to top not only the AC chart but also Billboards all-genre listing, the Hot 100.  AC number ones by Phil Collins, Mike and the Mechanics, Simply Red, the Bangles and Richard Marx also topped the Hot 100.  Roy Orbison, who had died the previous December, achieved a posthumous Hot Adult Contemporary number one in February when "You Got It" topped the chart.  Acts to top the Hot Adult Contemporary listing for the first time in 1989 included the southern rock group 38 Special.  The uncharacteristic ballad "Second Chance", which spent two weeks in the top spot, was the only AC hit which the band achieved in its career.

Chart history

References

See also
1989 in music
List of artists who reached number one on the U.S. Adult Contemporary chart

1989
1989 record charts
1989 in American music